Dębnik may refer to the following places:
Dębnik, Lesser Poland Voivodeship (south Poland)
Dębnik, Lubusz Voivodeship (west Poland)
Dębnik, Opole Voivodeship (south-west Poland)
Dębnik, Pomeranian Voivodeship (north Poland)
Dębnik, Warmian-Masurian Voivodeship (north Poland)